Varsity Gymnasium is an 8,000 seat multi-purpose arena in Boone, North Carolina. It opened in 1968 and was home to the Appalachian State Mountaineers basketball teams until the Holmes Center opened in 2000. The gym is currently home to the wrestling program. It is also home to the dance studios of the Appalachian State University Department of Theatre and Dance, part of the College of Fine and Applied Arts, as well as the ROTC program.

History
The gymnasium was dedicated December 7, 1968. The original cost of the  facility was $2 million USD. It had hydraulic stages, seven  supporting beams, physiological laboratories and 8 ticket gates. In addition to the main court area, the gym also included racquetball courts and a wrestling room for team practices. The gym was located adjacent to Broome-Kirk gym, which has since been demolished.

Concerts at Varsity Gym have included Jimmy Buffett, Bob Dylan, Phish and 38 Special.

References

External links
 Varsity Gymnasium at GoASU

Appalachian State Mountaineers basketball venues
Defunct college basketball venues in the United States
Basketball venues in North Carolina
Sports venues in Watauga County, North Carolina
1968 establishments in North Carolina
Sports venues completed in 1968
College wrestling venues in the United States